The 2017–18 season was Falkirk’s fifth season in the Scottish Championship and their seventh consecutive season in the second-tier of Scottish football following their relegation from the Scottish Premier League at the end of the 2009–10 season. Falkirk also competed in the League Cup, Challenge Cup and the Scottish Cup.

Summary

Management
Falkirk began the 2017–18 season under the management of Peter Houston who had guided the club to a Premiership play-off place in his previous two seasons. On 24 September, Houston left his position as manager following a poor start to the season. Paul Hartley was appointed as his replacement on 4 October and guided the club to safety with an eighth place finish at the end of the season.

Results and fixtures

Scottish Championship

Scottish League Cup

Group stage
Results

Knockout stage

Scottish Challenge Cup

Scottish Cup

Player statistics

|-
|colspan="12"|Players who left the club during the 2017–18 season
|-

|}

Club statistics

League table

Division summary

Transfers

Players in

Players out

See also
List of Falkirk F.C. seasons

References

Falkirk
Falkirk F.C. seasons